The dusky galaxias (Galaxias pullus) is a galaxiid of the genus Galaxias, found only in the Taieri and Clutha catchments in Otago, New Zealand.

References

Galaxias
Endemic freshwater fish of New Zealand
Taxa named by Bob McDowall
Fish described in 1997